The Instituto Nacional de Estadística (INE, Statistics National Institute) is the main public statistical body of the Venezuelan Government, being the central entity of the National Statistical System and is in charge of the systematization and publication of statistical data in the Venezuelan territory.

History
The General Directorate of Statistics was created in 1871 as part of the Ministry of Development. The aim was to collect important agricultural and economic information for the country. In 1873, the First National Population Census was carried out, which produced a total population of 1,783,993 inhabitants; in 1881 the second was carried out and in 1991 the third. Thus, one of the Directorate's most significant accomplishments was the conduct of general population censuses with some regularity in the country. Venezuela has carried out 14 censuses from the first one carried out in the year 1873 to 2011.

After 1936, and especially with the enactment of the National Statistics and Census Law of 1944, the National Government showed renewed interest in statistics. The 1944 Law reinforced the obligation of all residents of the country (nationals and foreigners), of all public and private organizations, and of all public officials, to submit the data required of them (according to the technical specifications that are required of them), indicated to collaborate with the National Executive, when requested, in the development of operations.

For 1978, the Central Office of Statistics and Informatics was created, also attached to the Ministry of Development. A few months before the approval of the Statistical Public Function Law (November 2001), officially the institution acquired the name of the Statistics National Institute. By July 2001, it was attached to the Ministry of People's Power of the Office of the Presidency and Monitoring of Government Management and is currently attached to the Ministry of People's Power for Planning.

References

External links
INE website

Venezuela
Government of Venezuela
Organizations established in 1871